Diana Adamyan (born 2000) is an Armenian violinist who won the first prize in the Senior Division of the Menuhin International Competition in 2018. In 2020, she also won the Khachaturian Violin Competition which was held online due the COVID-19 pandemic.

Laureate of the CIS International Award «Commonwealth of Debuts» in 2018.

References

External links
Diana Adamyan - Armenian National Music

2000 births
Living people
Armenian classical violinists
Women classical violinists
21st-century classical violinists
21st-century Armenian women musicians